Aristovoulos Petmezas was a Greek gymnast and sport shooter. He was born in Kalavryta. He competed in the 1896 Summer Olympics in Athens.

Petmezas entered the pommel horse event. He did not earn a medal, though beyond that his placement in the competition is unknown. He also competed in the military rifle and military pistol events. His places and scores in those competitions are also unknown, though he must have placed between 14th and 41st in the rifle and between 6th and 13th in the pistol.

References

External links
 

Gymnasts at the 1896 Summer Olympics
19th-century sportsmen
Shooters at the 1896 Summer Olympics
Olympic gymnasts of Greece
Olympic shooters of Greece
Greek male artistic gymnasts
Greek male sport shooters
Year of birth missing
Year of death missing
Place of death missing
People from Kalavryta
Sportspeople from the Peloponnese